In Greek mythology, Apheleia was the spirit and personification of ease, simplicity and primitivity in the good sense, "the good old days". According to Eustathius, she had an altar at the Acropolis of Athens and was honored as a nurse of Athena.

References

Sources
Realencyclopädie der Classischen Altertumswissenschaft, Band I, Halbband 2, Alexandrou-Apollokrates (1894), s. 2175, u. Apheleia (German)

Personifications in Greek mythology
Athena
Greek goddesses